Wetback Tank is a reservoir in Sierra County, New Mexico, in the United States.

The name of the reservoir has been criticized in the media for containing the ethnic slur wetback.

References

Reservoirs in New Mexico
Bodies of water of Sierra County, New Mexico